Pakistan Federation of Business and Professional Women is based in Islamabad, Pakistan.

See also 
 Women in Pakistan
 All Pakistan Women's Association
 Aurat Foundation
 Blue Veins
 Women's Action Forum
 Women's rights
 Women in Islam

Women's organisations based in Pakistan
Year of establishment missing
Business organisations based in Pakistan